The S. V. Ranga Rao Nandi Award for Best Character Actor winners since 1995:

Winners

References

Character Actor